Pseudolabrys taiwanensis is a Gram-negative, rod-shaped bacteria from the family of Nitrobacteraceae which has been isolated from soil from Sinshe in Taichung County in Taiwan.

References

Further reading

External links
Type strain of Pseudolabrys taiwanensis at BacDive -  the Bacterial Diversity Metadatabase

Nitrobacteraceae
Bacteria described in 2006